List of T'ai chi ch'uan  forms, postures, movements, or positions in order of number of forms:

Hand forms
  4 - Chen 4 Step is a subset of Chen Old Frame One (Zhu Tian Cai)
  4 - Chen 4 Step is a subset of Chen Beijing Branch (Wang Xiaojun) 
  5 - Yang 5 Step (Wang Xiaojun)
  8 - Yang Standardized
  8 - Chen Standardized
  9 - Chen Old Frame (Master Liu Yong)
 10 - Yang Introductory Form (also often called 8-step)
 11 - Chen created by Liming Yue after many years of study with Chen Zhenglei and Kongjie Gou
 12 - Chen(Based on the movements from Feng Zhiqiang's Chen Style Xinyi Hunyuan Taijiquan system. Taught by the SF Wushu Team)
 12 - Yang
 13 - Chen (created by Master Chen Bing based on the movements from (Old Frame, First Routine, Lao Jia Yi Lu))
 13 - Chen (aka Five Element Chen) subset of either Old Frame One or Small Frame (Zhu Tian Cai)
 13 - Dong Yue (East Mountain) Combined
 13 - Wudang (Zhang SanFeng - Wudang Nei Jia Quan) - Shi San Shi
 13 - Yang Family 13-Form
 13 - Chu style Yang form Long 108 and  Short 37 movements
 14/16 - Guangbo (Guang-Bo) (a mixture of Chen, Yang, Wu, and Qigong that was done by factory workers in China)
 16 - Yang Standardized
 16 - Chen Standardized
 16 - Actually Chen 4 Step (see above) popularly repeated in four directions of the compass (Zhu Tian Cai)
 16 - Yang Family 16-Form
 18 - Chen (Chen Zhenglei)
 18 - Wudang (Zhang SanFeng - simplified new form)
 19 - Chen (Chen Xiao Wang)
 20 - 5 Section Taijiquan (Yang Simplified)
 20 - 5 Section Chen Taijiquan (Chen Simplified)
 20 - Simplified form of Chen Xiaojia (Small frame of Chen T'ai Chi Ch'uan)
 24 - Yang ('Simplified', 'Beijing', 'New Style') Standardized
 24 - Chen Shi (Chen style) Xinyi Hunyuan Taijiquan (24 Form by Feng Zhiqiang)
 24 - Zhao Bao
 24 - Jingquanshitaijiquan (24 Forms - T'ien Ti Tao/Tiandidao)
 26 - Yang
 28 - Yang
 28 - Wudang Taiji
 32 - Combined Form
 32 - Chen Standardized "Fist" (New Frame)
 32 - Yang 
 34 - Wudang short
 35 - Sun Standardized Short
 36 - Chen Standardized, Beijing Branch (Tian Xiuchen and Kan Guixiang)  
 36 - Fu style short form tai chi ch'uan
 36 - Wu Short Form
 37 - Wu (Wang Pei-sheng) Short
 37 - Yang (Zheng, Cheng Man-ch'ing) Short
 37 - Taiji 37 (Dr. Shen Hongxun) Short
 38 - Chen (Chen Xiao Wang)
 39 - Chen (Old frame 39)
 39 - Chen (New frame 39)
 40 - Yang competition
 40 - Sun Family Modern Short Form
 40 - Jingquanshitaijiquan (40 Steps or 24 Forms - T'ien Ti Tao/Tiandidao)
 41 - Sun 41: Tai Chi for Arthritis (TCA), created by Dr. Paul Lam of the Tai Chi for Health Institute, Sydney, Australia. Sun 20: Basic 6 moves, performed on Right and Left. Sun 41: additional 6 moves, also performed both sides.
 42 - Yang
 42 - Chen (Old form cannon fist)
 42 - Combined Style Competition Form
 42 - Sun Traditional Short
 43 - Yang (Jiang Yu Kun)
 43 - Zhao Bao
 46 - Yang Competition
 46 - Wu competition
 48 - Old Combined Style Competition Form
 48 - Chen Shi (Chen style) Xinyi Hunyuan Taijiquan (48 Form by Feng Zhiqiang)
 49 - Yang Family Demonstration and Competition Form ("Short" Form)
 49 - Wu (Hao) short form
 50 - Lee-style short form
 53 - Fu style advanced tai chi
 54 - Wu Jianquan family (Wu Daxin) competition form
 56 - Chen Competition
 56 - Zhao Bao
 64 - Yang (Kuang Ping style)
64 - Chen Style Taijiquan Practical Method Erlu
 66 - Combined Standardized (Lost, original content unknown)
 67 - Movements Combined Tai-Chi Chuan form
 67 - Fu style tai chi lightning palm
 67 - Hwa Yu T'ai Chi Long Form
 71 - Chen Erlu (Cannon Fist), Beijing Branch (Chen Fake) 
 72 - Huang Sheng Shyan Form 
 73 - Sun Competition
 74 - Chen (Old Frame, First Routine, Lao Jia Yi Lu)
 77 - Yang Extended Renovation
 81 - Wu (Hao) Old Form
81 - Chen Style Taijiquan Practical Method Yilu
 81 - WoLong, Divine Fractal Form 
 83 - Chen Yilu, Beijing Branch (Chen Fake)
 83 - Beijing Northern Wu Style Taijiquan
 83 - Chen New Form (Chen Village)
 88 - Yang Standardized (which appears to differ slightly from traditional forms of similar length)
 95 - Shanghai Jianchuan T'ai Chi Association Wu Style Tai Chi Fast Form
 96 - Wu (Hao) long form
 96 - Ma Yungsheng "New Taijiquan" 96-steps as taught in Nanjing Central Kuoshu Academy. Currently it is also known as Ma-family Taijiquan and as it covers the 8 directions, some called it Taiji-baqua quan.
 97/98 - Sun Traditional Long
 103 - Yang long form (The moves can also add up to 85, 88, 108 or 150 depending on how they are counted.)
 105 - Fu style Tai Chi Ch'uan
 108 - Taoist Tai Chi form, As done by Taoist Tai Chi Society
 108 - Chen
 108 - Wu Jianquan long form
 119 - Wudang long
 120 - Tchoung_Ta-chen - Annotated Form
 127 - Yangjia Michuan Taiji Quan - Yang Family Hidden Tradition
 140 - Lee-style form
144 - Chen Style Taijiquan Practical Method Combined Yilu-Erlu
 180 - Wu Long Form
 185 - Lee-style Tai Chi dance (Tiàowǔ 跳舞)
 229 - Tchoung_Ta-chen - Long Form

Weapon forms 
 13 - Dong Yue (East Mountain) Combined Sword
 13 - Wu Jianquan Spear
 13 - Beijing Northern Wu Style Tai Ji Shi San [13] Dao.
 13 - Posture Poem Yang family tai chi chuan Saber Form
 13 - Yang family Broadsword (Dao)
 14 - Chen Taiji Halberd (Guandao/Dadao), Chen Beijing Branch
 16 - Yang Standardized Sword
 16 - Yang/Combined Standardized Spear
 18 - Chen 'Health' Standardized Sword
 20 - Chen sword Xiaojia
 23 - Chen long stick (gun), Chen Beijing Branch
 23 - Chen Broadsword
 24 - Wu Jianquan Spear
 27 - 5 Section solo Taijijian
 30 - Chen Taiji Halberd (GuanDao/DaDao).
 32 - Yang/Combined Sword
 32 - Divine Staff of T'ien Ti Tao/Tiandidao.
 36 - Chen Sword, Beijing Branch(Tian Xiuchen)
 36 - Chen Broadsword, Beijing Branch(Tian Xiuchen)
 36 - Chen Shi (Chen Style) Xinyi Hun Yuan broadsword
 36 - Yang Shi Tai Chi Fan
 40 - Chen Broadsword
 42 - T'ai Chi Dao of T'ien Ti Tao/Tiandidao.
 42 - Competition Sword Tai Chi Jian (complements 42 Tai Chi Chuan competition forms)
 46 - Chen Broadsword, Beijing Branch (Tian Qiutian)
 48 - Chen Hand Fan (Ma Chunxi)
 48 - Chen Shi (Chen Style) Xinyi Hun Yuan sword
 49 - Chen Sword
 54 - Yang Sword
 56 - Fu style tai chi seven star sword
 58 - Chen Sword, Beijing Branch (Chen Fake)
 60 - Wu style Tai Ji Jian (Created by Master Chian Ho Yin)
 62 - Chen Single Sword
 64 - 5 Section 2 person Taijijian
 67 - Movement Yang family tai chi chuan Sword Form
 84 - Wu Style Heaven and Earth Sword Form (Qian Kun Jian)
 92 - Wudang Single Sword
 108 - Wu Jianquan Sabre (Dao)
 108 - Wu Jianquan Sword (Jian)
 216 - Lee style T'ai Chi Ch'uan sword
 270 - Lee style T'ai Chi Ch'uan Stick (Staff)

See also

Chen-style (陳氏)
Yang-style (楊家)
Wu-style of Wu Ch'uan-yu and Wu Chien-ch'uan (吳家)
Wu or Wu/Hao-style of Wu Yu-hsiang (武家)
Sun-style (孫家)
Yangjia Michuan-style (楊家秘傳)
Lee-style (李氏)
Pushing hands

References

 Tina Chunna Zhang, Frank Allen (2006). Classical Northern Wu Style Tai Ji Quan. Blue Snake Books, Berkeley, California, USA. 
 Wang Pei-sheng, Zeng Weiqi (1983). Wu Style Taijiquan. Hai Feng Publishing Company, Hong Kong.

External links 
Listing of Tai Chi and Wushu forms in Chinese (traditional and simplified characters) and English

Tai chi
Neijia